Pheidole fossimandibula is a species of ant discovered and described by Longino, J. T. in 2009.

References

fossimandibula
Insects described in 2009